Alla Kali Krishna Srinivas or Alla Nani is an Indian politician. He was the ex. Deputy Chief Minister of Andhra Pradesh.

Political career
He was a legislator in the Andhra Pradesh Legislative Assembly from Eluru constituency between 2004 - 2013, as a member of the Indian National Congress. He resigned as MLA from Congress and joined YSR Congress Party (YSRCP) in 2013. He contested for the YSRCP in the 2014 elections but lost. He became MLC in 2017 and again contested MLA from Eluru and was re-elected as MLA in the 2019 elections from YSRCP and he became the Deputy Chief Minister and Minister of Health and Family Welfare, Medical Education in Y. S. Jagan Mohan Reddy's cabinet in Andhra Pradesh.

References

Living people
People from Eluru
Andhra Pradesh MLAs 2009–2014
Andhra Pradesh MLAs 2014–2019
YSR Congress Party politicians
Indian National Congress politicians
Andhra Pradesh MLAs 2019–2024
Deputy Chief Ministers of Andhra Pradesh
1969 births
Indian National Congress politicians from Andhra Pradesh